The Mount Shimen is a mountain in Ren'ai Township, Nantou County and Xiulin Township, Hualien County of Taiwan.

Geology
The peak of the mountain stands at an elevation of 3,237 meters above sea level.

See also
 List of mountains in Taiwan

References

Landforms of Hualien County
Landforms of Nantou County
Shimen